The Occasionals is the debut solo album by Canadian singer-songwriter Jim Bryson, released in 2000.

Track listing
All songs written by Jim Bryson, except as noted
 Without Piano
 Travelled by Land
 26 Miles by Car
 February
 Satellite
 Impaler
 Lately
 Soupy Sayles
 One Cigarette

References

2000 debut albums
Jim Bryson albums